OpenBroadcaster is a web-based, open-source system to run community radio and television broadcast transmitters with a simple web interface.

History 
The initial concept was to develop a web based radio system to run emergency messages and public service announcements for export to Africa by  using a windup radio designed by Trevor Baylis.
.  It was part of a Yukon College innovation  project originating from Tagish Yukon Territory Canada.

On Labour Day weekend, 1997 CFET-FM 106.7FM was launched, for the benefit of communities in Tagish, Johnson's Crossing and Marsh Lake, YT. It was a one-man operation, but local volunteers could record material for sending to the station via the internet for broadcast. The system was used for the community's local emergency population warning for instantaneous relay of Yukon Forestry Service alerts for Wildfire situations. 2004 CFET-FM Radio began using OpenBroadcaster for User Generated Radio followed by CJUC-FM forming a Yukon network of radio stations. Similar models of indigenous community radio networks are supported nationally for language revitalization.

Version history

Components
OBServer: HTML5 AJAX web application for uploading content, creating smart playlists, managing users, assigning users to timeslots and for scheduling music. Decentralized file storage with centralized cloud computing management.
OBPlayer: Linux application with GUI for logging and managing devices connected to transmitters, digital screens and supported devices accessible through a secure http(s) admin panel.  Supports Audio over IP Ravenna (networking).
Mobile: Cross platform application written in PhoneGap to allow users the ability to pitch electronic money to performers and artists in real time.

Practical Uses

Audio
Source client for Icecast Shoutcast streaming media server, LPFM and under regulated radio, Smart music scheduling system to microbroadcast theme based music segments for restaurants and public spaces, Tourism Radio with Audio tour GPS coded triggering for multicultural visitor experience, tourist information and highway advisory radio, User Determined Music Discovery Service, Dynamic Podcast assembler, Logging and archiving, Community radio Campus radio and High school radio networking, Special interest multicultural media in Canada broadcasters, Syndicated in store advertising and public address distribution, Music on hold for telephone systems, Computer DJ Crowdcasting Community Jukebox, Source for interplanetary Active SETI, RDS and Datacasting to remotely control Addressability devices with Crisis mapping, Song Requester 100% user-controlled radio.

Video
Low power Community television, under regulated TV service, User generated Community channel (Canada) on Cable TV, User Generated Adult Entertainment Channel Digital signage and visitor information, Analogue and Digital source material distribution and archiving for display in museums, Video on demand with podcasting utilizing digital rights management, Out-of-home advertising via shopping mall directories and digital menu boards with point-of-purchase promotions.

See also 

 Broadcast automation
 Radio software
 Community radio
 Linux Radio Broadcasting Software
 List of music software

References

External links 
 

Broadcasting
Community radio organizations
Emergency management software
Emergency population warning systems
Free audio software
Free multimedia software
Internet radio software
Streaming television
Media servers
Multimedia software
Radio technology
Software that uses GStreamer
Software using the GNU AGPL license
Streaming media systems
Streaming software